In detection systems, the noise-equivalent target (NET) is the intensity of a target measured by a system when the signal-to-noise ratio of the system is 1.

Noise-equivalent temperature is an example for noise-equivalent target.

Physical quantities
Vector calculus